Yuri Konstantinovich Milonov (Nizhny Novgorod – 7 April 1980, Moscow) was a political activist in the Russian Empire who joined the Bolshevik faction of the Russian Social Democratic and Labour Party in 1912. Arrested in 1915, he was only released after the February Revolution in 1917. He was active in Samara during the Russian Civil War. He supported the Workers' Opposition and was advocate of the Proletkult movement.

10th Party Congress
He attended the 10th Congress of the Russian Communist Party (b) where he claimed that the Communist Party was ceasing to be a workers party.

References

1895 births
1980 deaths
Politicians from Nizhny Novgorod
Soviet economists
Revolutionaries from the Russian Empire
Russian Social Democratic Labour Party members
Bolsheviks
Soviet military personnel of the Russian Civil War
All-Russian Central Executive Committee members
Machinists
Soviet rehabilitations
Soviet engineers
Soviet inventors
Soviet Marxist historians
Historians of technology
Russian architectural historians
Burials at Novodevichy Cemetery